One Maritime Plaza is an office tower located in San Francisco's Financial District near the Embarcadero Center towers on Clay and Front Streets. The building, built as the Alcoa Building for Alcoa Corporation and completed in 1964, stands 121 m (398 feet) and has 25 floors of office space. The surrounding plaza was finished in 1967. This is one of the earliest buildings to use seismic bracing in the form of external trusses and X-braces.

Tenants
In December 2018, Google signed a deal to lease 190,000 sqft of this building.

CVC Capital Partners
Farallon Capital
Cowen Group
Skidmore, Owings & Merrill

See also
List of tallest buildings in San Francisco

References

External links
 

Skyscraper office buildings in San Francisco
Financial District, San Francisco
Del Monte Foods
Skidmore, Owings & Merrill buildings
Office buildings completed in 1967